Dice (2001) is a Canada/UK co-produced drama television mini-series. It was directed by Rachel Talalay and written by A. L. Kennedy and John Burnside, inspired by cult 70s novel The Dice Man by Luke Rhinehart.

Plot
Dice tells the story of charismatic psychology teacher, Glenn Taylor, who manipulates people by teaching them how to live by the throw of a dice. When the small community is shattered by the death of student Sally Quine, Detective Patrick Styvesant finds himself drawn deeper into a bizarre world where decisions are ruled by the dice. As Taylor's influence over the community deepens, Patrick also has his own demons to contend with as he battles alcoholism and his repressed homosexuality, all of which make him a perfect target for Taylor.

Main cast
Martin Cummins as Patrick Styvesant
Aidan Gillen as Glenn Taylor
Gina McKee as Angela Starck
Fred Ward as Gacy
Brendan Fletcher as Alasdair MacCrae
Callum Keith Rennie as Egon Schwimmer
Tracy Wright as Gil

Awards

Dice was nominated twice for 2002 Gemini awards: Best Dramatic Series (producers Lorraine Richard, Greg Dummett, Gub Neal) and Best Actor in a Drama (Martin Cummins).

Production

Dice was co-produced by Cité-Amérique and Showcase Television in Canada and Box TV in the UK. It debuted on The Movie Network in Eastern Canada and on Movie Central in Western Canada in November 2001, and was originally aired as a six-episode season.

The series was filmed in Montreal over 45 days from May to July 5, 2001. It was shot on Super 16 by DOP Jean-Pierre Trudel. The leading cast included British actors (Aidan Gillen from Queer as Folk and Gina McKee) as well as Canadian actors (Martin Cummins, Callum Keith Rennie, Brendan Fletcher, Mark McKinney, actor/jazz singer Dorothée Berryman, Gary Farmer), plus U.S. actor Fred Ward. The budget was $6 million.

A second six-hour season was planned to be filmed in the fall of 2002 but was never shot further to production issues.

DVD

Dice was released in DVD in 2007 by Digital Classics DVD as a 2 x 102 mins two-parter instead of the original 6 x 34 mins episodes.

Episodes

References

External links

Dice at DigitalClassics
Director's page
Production’s Notes

2001 films
2000s Canadian television miniseries
2000s British television miniseries
2000s British drama television series
2000s Canadian drama television series
2000s British LGBT-related drama television series
2000s Canadian LGBT-related drama television series
English-language Canadian films
Crave original programming
Films directed by Rachel Talalay